Astana is the capital of Kazakhstan. Founded as Akmoly, it was once the seat of an okrug of the Russian Empire from 1830, it was granted town status and the name was modified to Akmolinsk in 1832. Although damaged during revolts in 1838, Akmolinsk continued to be a center of Russian colonial administration and to grow over the course of the 19th century. 

During World War II, Akmolinsk was a transportation hub for Soviet infrastructure evacuated from Eastern Europe, and after the war many Volga Germans were resettled in Astana following internal deportation in the Soviet Union. During Nikita Khrushchev's administration of the Soviet Union, Astana was the focus of agricultural production campaigns, which established state farms and brought Russian immigrants to the region as agricultural workers. During this period, the city was renamed Tselinograd.

Following the dissolution of the Soviet Union and the independence of Kazakhstan, the city's name was changed to Akmola, meaning "white grave," which the city's original name Akmoly may have been named for. It became the capital of Kazakhstan in 1997, and was renamed Astana ("capital city") in 1998. From 2019 to 2022, the city was known as Nur-Sultan in honor of Nursultan Nazarbayev, the country's first president.

Early history
The settlement of Akmoly, was established on the Ishim River in 1830 as the seat of an okrug. The name was possibly given after a local landmark—"" (Akmola) literally means a white grave in Kazakh—although this theory is not universally accepted. In 1832, the settlement was granted town status and named Akmolinsk. In 1838, at the height of the great national and liberation movement headed by Kenesary Khan, Akmolinsk fortress was burned. After the repression of the liberation movement, the fortress was rebuilt. On 16 July 1863, Akmolinsk was officially declared an uyezd town. During the rapid development of the Russian capitalist market, the huge Saryarka areas were actively exploited by the colonial administration. To draft Regulation governing the Kazakh steppe the Government of the Russian Empire formed Steppe Commission in 1865. In 1869, Akmolinsk external district and department were cancelled, and Akmolinsk became a center of newly established Akmolinsk Oblast.

Soviet Union
During World War II, Akmolinsk served as a traffic hub for the transportation of engineering tools and equipment from the evacuated plants of Ukrainian SSR, Byelorussian SSR, and Russian SFSR redirected to the Oblasts of the Kazakh SSR. Local industries were organized for war needs, assisting the country in providing the "Front Line" and the "Home Front" with essential material and equipment. In the post-war years many Russian-Germans were resettled here after being deported under the leadership of Joseph Stalin.

The city was designated the administrative and cultural center of the Virgin Lands Campaign in the 1950s,  with the aim of turning the region into a second grain producer for the Soviet Union. In 1961, to commemorate the campaign, the city was renamed Tselinograd. The high portion of Russian immigrants in this area, which later led to ethnic tension, can be traced to the influx of agricultural workers at this time.

Independent Kazakhstan
After the dissolution of the Soviet Union and the consequent independence of Kazakhstan, the city's original form was restored in the modified form Akmola. Akmola was made the capital of Kazakhstan on the 10 December 1997 The city was renamed Astana, which means "capital city" in Kazakh, in 1998.

Following the resignation of Nursultan Nazarbayev on March 19, 2019, Astana was renamed Nur-Sultan in his honor. The name Astana was readopted in 2022 following a proposal by members of the Parliament of Kazakhstan.

References

 
History of Kazakhstan